The brothers Giovanni "Hans" Schlumpf (February 1904, in Omegna, Italy – 1989) and Federico "Fritz" Schlumpf (February 1906, in Omegna, Italy – April 18, 1992) were Swiss textile industrialists and collectors of automobiles.  They are best known for the Schlumpf Collection housed at the Musée National de l'Automobile de Mulhouse.

They were sons of the textile industrialist Carl Schlumpf and his wife Jeanne Becker. The Schlumpf family moved to Mulhouse, France (then in Germany) in 1908.  Hans and Fritz Schlumpf lived in Mulhouse at their country house, Malmerspach, until they escaped and became Swiss exiles in 1977.

After World War II Fritz and Hans Schlumpf gathered an enormous collection of classic automobiles, including several hundred Bugattis (many of them in pieces or unrestored, but many were also completed cars). To fund this hobby they encumbered their enterprise to such an extent that by 1977 it became insolvent. Until this time the automobile collection was unknown to the public, but the excesses were revealed in 1977 during a strike by the former Schlumpf textile workers.

Further reading 
 

French businesspeople
Car collectors
Sibling duos